The 1973–74 New York Knicks season was the 28th season for the team in the National Basketball Association (NBA). The Knicks entered the season as the defending NBA champions, having defeated the Los Angeles Lakers in the 1973 NBA Finals in five games to win their second championship. In the regular season, the Knicks finished in second place in the Atlantic Division with a 49–33 record, and qualified for the NBA Playoffs for the eighth consecutive year.

New York opened the 1974 playoffs against the Capital Bullets. With a 4–3 series victory, the Knicks advanced to the Eastern Conference Finals, where they faced the Boston Celtics. The Celtics, who later won the NBA Finals, defeated the Knicks in five games, ending New York's title defense.

Draft picks

Note: This is not an extensive list; it only covers the first and second rounds, and any other players picked by the franchise that played at least one game in the league.

Roster

Regular season

Season standings

z – clinched division title
y – clinched division title
x – clinched playoff spot

Record vs. opponents

Game log

Playoffs

|- align="center" bgcolor="#ccffcc"
| 1
| March 29
| Capital
| W 102–91
| Walt Frazier (20)
| Walt Frazier (12)
| Dave DeBusschere (7)
| Madison Square Garden19,694
| 1–0
|- align="center" bgcolor="#ffcccc"
| 2
| March 31
| @ Capital
| L 87–99
| Dave DeBusschere (20)
| Dave DeBusschere (10)
| Jerry Lucas (5)
| Capital Centre16,522
| 1–1
|- align="center" bgcolor="#ffcccc"
| 3
| April 2
| Capital
| L 79–88
| Walt Frazier (20)
| Dave DeBusschere (12)
| DeBusschere, Meminger (5)
| Madison Square Garden19,694
| 1–2
|- align="center" bgcolor="#ccffcc"
| 4
| April 5
| @ Capital
| W 101–93 (OT)
| Earl Monroe (23)
| Walt Frazier (11)
| Walt Frazier (6)
| Capital Centre19,035
| 2–2
|- align="center" bgcolor="#ccffcc"
| 5
| April 7
| Capital
| W 106–105
| Walt Frazier (38)
| Dave DeBusschere (8)
| Walt Frazier (4)
| Madison Square Garden19,694
| 3–2
|- align="center" bgcolor="#ffcccc"
| 6
| April 10
| @ Capital
| L 92–109
| Walt Frazier (25)
| Phil Jackson (8)
| Walt Frazier (10)
| Capital Centre19,025
| 3–3
|- align="center" bgcolor="#ccffcc"
| 7
| April 12
| Capital
| W 91–81
| Earl Monroe (20)
| DeBusschere, Gianelli (15)
| Dave DeBusschere (7)
| Madison Square Garden19,694
| 4–3
|-

|- align="center" bgcolor="#ffcccc"
| 1
| April 14
| @ Boston
| L 88–113
| Walt Frazier (16)
| Dave DeBusschere (10)
| Meminger, Bibby (3)
| Boston Garden14,101
| 0–1
|- align="center" bgcolor="#ffcccc"
| 2
| April 16
| Boston
| L 99–111
| Bill Bradley (20)
| Dave DeBusschere (9)
| Walt Frazier (4)
| Madison Square Garden19,694
| 0–2
|- align="center" bgcolor="#ccffcc"
| 3
| April 19
| @ Boston
| W 103–100
| Walt Frazier (38)
| Frazier, Gianelli (10)
| Walt Frazier (4)
| Boston Garden15,320
| 1–2
|- align="center" bgcolor="#ffcccc"
| 4
| April 21
| Boston
| L 91–98
| Walt Frazier (25)
| John Gianelli (9)
| Earl Monroe (5)
| Madison Square Garden19,694
| 1–3
|- align="center" bgcolor="#ffcccc"
| 5
| April 24
| @ Boston
| L 94–105
| Phil Jackson (27)
| Phil Jackson (9)
| Walt Frazier (6)
| Boston Garden15,320
| 1–4
|-

Player statistics

Season

Playoffs

Awards and records
Walt Frazier, All-NBA First Team
Walt Frazier, NBA All-Defensive First Team
Dave DeBusschere, NBA All-Defensive First Team

References

External links
1973–74 New York Knickerbockers Statistics

New York
New York Knicks seasons
New York Knicks
New York Knicks
1970s in Manhattan
Madison Square Garden